Ralph Neville-Grenville DL, JP (born Ralph Neville; 27 February 1817 – 20 August 1886) was a British Conservative Party politician.

Background
Born Ralph Neville, he was the eldest son of the Very Revd and Hon George Neville-Grenville (Dean of Windsor and son of Richard Griffin, 2nd Baron Braybrooke) and his wife Lady Charlotte Neville-Grenville (née Lady Charlotte Legge, second daughter of George Legge, 3rd Earl of Dartmouth). In 1854, on the death of his father he assumed the additional surname Grenville. Neville-Grenville was educated at Eton College and later Magdalene College, Cambridge, where he graduated with a Master of Arts in 1837. He served in the British Army and was lieutenant-colonel of the West Somerset Yeomanry Cavalry.

Career
Neville-Grenville entered the British House of Commons as Member of Parliament (MP) for Windsor in 1841, representing it until 1847. He sat again for East Somerset from 1865 to 1868, and subsequently for Mid Somerset until his resignation in 1878. In 1846, Neville-Grenville was a Lord of the Treasury. He was appointed High Sheriff of Somerset in 1862 and was a deputy lieutenant and justice of the peace for the same county.

Family
On 18 September 1845, he married Julia Roberta Russell, daughter of Sir Robert Frankland Russell, 7th Baronet at All Souls Church, Langham Place. They had nine children, three daughters and six sons. A son was Admiral George Neville.

References

External links

1817 births
1886 deaths
Alumni of Magdalene College, Cambridge
Conservative Party (UK) MPs for English constituencies
Deputy Lieutenants of Somerset
High Sheriffs of Somerset
People educated at Eton College
UK MPs 1841–1847
UK MPs 1865–1868
UK MPs 1868–1874
UK MPs 1874–1880
West Somerset Yeomanry officers